Oswald José Peraza [pay-RAH-za] (born October 19, 1962) is a Venezuelan former starting pitcher in Major League Baseball who played for the Baltimore Orioles (1988). He batted and threw right-handed. As of the 2014 season, he is the pitching coach for the Dominican Summer League Blue Jays.

Peraza was a hard thrower with a fastball in the 94–95 range. He also had a good slider and a fine change-up. He was traded from the Toronto Blue Jays to the Orioles for Mike Flanagan on August 31, 1987 in a transaction that was completed four days later on September 4 when José Mesa was sent to Baltimore. Peraza debuted with Baltimore in 1988, then missed the following season with arm problems, which were serious enough to affect the rest of his career. In his rookie season, Peraza posted a 10–14 record with 61 strikeouts and a 5.55 of ERA in 86 innings pitched.

Peraza, who was once one of the more highly touted prospects in the game, could not make it out of Triple-A ball after 1988 and he retired for good after three injury riddled years (1990–92).

See also
 List of players from Venezuela in Major League Baseball

References

External links
, or Retrosheet, or Pelota Binaria (Venezuelan Winter League)

1962 births
Living people
Baltimore Orioles players
Cardenales de Lara players
Florence Blue Jays players
Frederick Keys players
Gulf Coast Blue Jays players
Hagerstown Suns players
Kinston Blue Jays players
Knoxville Blue Jays players
Major League Baseball pitchers
Major League Baseball players from Venezuela
Minor league baseball coaches
People from Puerto Cabello
Rochester Red Wings players
Syracuse Chiefs players
Venezuelan baseball coaches
Venezuelan expatriate baseball players in the United States